Ryszard Kotys (20 March 1932 – 27 January 2021) was a Polish actor. He appeared in more than 140 films and television shows during his career.

Filmography

Film

Television

References

External links

1932 births
2021 deaths
Polish male film actors
Polish male stage actors
Polish male television actors
People from Kielce County
Deaths from the COVID-19 pandemic in Poland
Recipients of the Order of Polonia Restituta